The list of ship launches in 1897 includes a chronological list of some ships launched in 1897.


References 

Sources
 

1897
Shi